N,N-Dimethylaminomethylferrocene is the dimethylaminomethyl derivative of ferrocene, (C5H5)Fe(C5H4CH2N(CH3)2.  It is an air-stable, dark-orange syrup that is soluble in common organic solvents.  The compound is prepared by the reaction of ferrocene with formaldehyde and dimethylamine:
(C5H5)2Fe + CH2O  +  HN(CH3)2  →   (C5H5)Fe(C5H4CH2N(CH3)2  +  H2O
It is a precursor to prototypes of ferrocene-containing redox sensors and diverse ligands.

The amine can be quaternized, which provides access to many derivatives.

References

Ferrocenes
Sandwich compounds
Cyclopentadienyl complexes